Rustlers or The Rustlers is a 1919 American short silent Western film produced by John Ford and directed by Reginald Barker under the working title of Even Money.  The film was shot between February 28 and March 8, 1919 for April release that same year.  Ford himself chose to bring Pete Morrison  into this project (and others), and during the time of the film's shooting, he and Baker co-chaired a committee created by William Beaudine, then-president of The Motion Pictures Director's Association.

Plot
Ben Clayburn (Pete Morrison) uses the guise of a sheep rancher when sent to the town of Point Rock to track down the leader of a band of rustlers. He is accused himself of being one if the rustlers and Postmistress Nell Wyndham (Helen Gibson) saves him from an angry lynch mob. The two team up, and using her knowledge of the locals track down and capture the real outlaws.

Cast
 Pete Morrison as Ben Clayburn
 Helen Gibson as Postmistress Nell Wyndham
 Hoot Gibson  as The Deputy
 Jack Woods as Sheriff Buck Farley

See also
 Hoot Gibson filmography

References

External links
 
 
 I Razziatori (The Raiders) at cinobii.it (Italian)
 Rustlers at AllMovie

1919 films
1919 Western (genre) films
1919 short films
American silent short films
American black-and-white films
Films directed by John Ford
Silent American Western (genre) films
1910s American films